Exponent (formerly Failure Analysis Associates) is an American engineering and scientific consulting firm.  Exponent has a multidisciplinary team of scientists, physicians, engineers, and business consultants which performs research and analysis in more than 90 technical disciplines.  The company operates 20 offices in the United States and five offices overseas.

History

Founding and Leadership
Failure Analysis Associates (FaAA) was founded in April 1967 by then Stanford University professor Alan Stephen Tetelman along with his colleagues Bernard Ross, Marsh Pound, John Shyne and Sathya V. Hanagud with $500 in capital.

At the time of FaAA's founding, Ross was also an engineering program manager at SRI International (then the Stanford Research Institute) (1965–1970). While en route to the site of a Navy jet crash investigation, Tetelman was killed on September 25, 1978, in the PSA Flight 182 air crash over San Diego between a PSA jet liner and a private Cessna airplane that claimed the lives of 144 people. He was forty-two years old.

Ross assumed the presidency of Failure Analysis Associates after the accident. Ross and the late Tetelman were featured in a documentary film about the company titled "What Went Wrong" made by the United States Information Service and distributed worldwide.  Tetelman was a world-renowned expert in fracture mechanics and co-authored a textbook titled "The Principles of Engineering Materials" with  Craig R. Barrett (former CEO of Intel) and Stanford professor, William D. Nix, published by Prentice-Hall in 1973.

In 1982, Roger McCarthy assumed the leadership of FaAA, becoming chief executive officer in 1982 until 1996, and chairman of the board in 1986 until 2005. McCarthy joined FaAA in 1978 and became a director and vice-president in 1980.

In 2004, McCarthy was elected to the National Academy of Engineering.

Michael R. Gaulke served as the chief executive officer of Exponent Inc. from June 1996 to May 28, 2009. He is currently chairman of the board of directors.  Mr. Gaulke served as president of Exponent Inc. from March 1993 to May 22, 2007. Mr. Gaulke first joined Exponent Inc. in September 1992 and served as its executive vice president and chief financial officer.

In 2008, Oregon State University inducted Mr. Gaulke into its Engineering Hall of Fame.

Paul R. Johnston was the chief executive officer at Exponent Inc. from May 28, 2009 – May 31, 2018. Johnston was president of Exponent Inc. from May 2007 until July 2016. Johnston joined Exponent in 1981 and served as its Principal Engineer since 1987 and vice president since 1996. Johnston has co-authored a book titled "Structural Dynamics by Finite Elements" published by Prentice-Hall in 1987. On May 31, 2018, Johnston stepped down from the position of chief executive officer to be an executive chairman.

Catherine Corrigan was named president of Exponent, Inc. on July 29, 2016. Dr. Corrigan joined Exponent's Philadelphia office in 1996, was promoted to principal in 2002 and to corporate vice president in 2005. Corrigan was promoted to group vice president to lead the Transportation Group and joined the company's operating committee in 2012.

On May 31, 2018, Corrigan was appointed to chief executive officer.

Incorporation
Failure Analysis Associates was founded as a partnership, incorporated in 1968 in California and reincorporated in Delaware as Failure Analysis Associates, Inc. in 1988.

In 1989, McCarthy reincorporated Failure Analysis Associates, Inc. in Delaware under a holding company, The Failure Group, Inc. and took The Failure Group, Inc. public in 1990. The company changed its name to Exponent, Inc. in 1998.

Company activities
Exponent has been involved in the investigations of many well known incidents including the now debunked report aired on Dateline in 1993 about fires and explosions involving sidesaddle fuel tanks on Chevrolet C/K trucks, the disputed Consumer Reports finding on Suzuki roll-over safety, the 2009–2010 Toyota vehicle recalls, the crash of American Airlines Flight 587 among many other aviation accidents, and the Exxon Valdez oil spill. The Federal Emergency Management Agency also hired Exponent to examine the Oklahoma City bombing damage aftermath, specifically the damage to the Alfred P. Murrah Federal Building. NASA hired Exponent in 1986 to determine the causes of the Space Shuttle Challenger disaster.

In 2003, Exponent was hired by the U.S. government to investigate the Space Shuttle Columbia disaster. In 2017, Samsung hired Exponent to determine cause of thermal runaway of the Note 7 Phone batteries.

Exponent has ISO 9001 accreditation, indicating independently audited and certified quality management practices. The company also is certified for battery, energy storage and compliance testing.

Neutrality
The quality and neutrality of reports produced by the company have been called into question on various controversial topics. Common points of critique include corporate denialism and that, for industrial clients, only favorable reports are seemingly produced. Examples include Exponent arguing that dioxins and PFAS do not cause cancer.  These questions of conflict of interest have been disputed. The type of work that Exponent performs is contractually highly confidential—until their clients decide otherwise. Thus, while Exponent may issue reports that are both favorable and unfavorable to its clients, Exponent's clients have the option of releasing only the favorable reports, creating the appearance of bias.

According to the Los Angeles Times, "Exponent's research has come under fire from critics, including engineers, attorneys and academics who say the company tends to deliver to clients the reports they need to mount a public defense." Exponent's executive chairman responded that such criticism is a "cheap shot", responding "Do we tell our clients a lot of what they don't want to hear? Absolutely." but that they also often come up with results not favoring their clients. No concrete examples were however provided for the paper. In 2009, the Amazon Defense Coalition criticized an Exponent study commissioned by the energy company Chevron that dumping oil waste didn't cause cancer because Chevron's largest shareholder was a director on Exponent's board. The firm was also criticized for assisting industry efforts to reduce chromium regulation.

Notable Projects
Partial listing of notable projects:

 Chevrolet C/K
 Suzuki v. Consumers Union
 American Airlines Flight 587
 Turkish Airlines Flight 981
 Exxon Valdez
 Oklahoma City bombing
 Space Shuttle Challenger disaster
 Space Shuttle Columbia disaster
 2009–2011 Toyota vehicle recalls

 Drillship Seacrest
 Alexander L. Kielland (platform)
 Kansas City Hyatt Regency walkway collapse
 Kobe earthquake
 TWA Flight 800
 Assassination of John F. Kennedy
 James Dean motor vehicle accident
 Collapse of the World Trade Center
 Deflategate
 MARCbot
 Samsung Note 7

Research areas
Exponent's services are concentrated on multiple practices and centers, including:

 Biomechanics
 Biomedical Engineering
 Buildings & Structures
 Civil Engineering
 Construction Consulting
 Ecological & Biological Sciences
 Electrical Engineering & Computer Science
 Engineering Management Consulting
 Environmental & Earth Sciences
 Health Sciences

 Human Factors
 Industrial Structures
 Materials Science & Corrosion Engineering
 Mechanical Engineering
 Polymers Science & Materials Chemistry
 Statistical & Data Sciences
 Technology Development
 Thermal Sciences
 Vehicle Engineering
 Visual Communication

References

External links
 Official website

University spin-offs
Consulting firms established in 1967
Engineering consulting firms of the United States
International engineering consulting firms
Companies listed on the Nasdaq
Companies based in Menlo Park, California
Multinational companies headquartered in the United States
1967 establishments in California